F Line may refer to:

F (New York City Subway service)
F (Los Angeles Railway), a former rail route in Los Angeles, United States
F Line (RTD), a light rail line in Denver, United States
F (S-train), an urban rail line in Copenhagen, Denmark
F Market & Wharves, the historic streetcar line in San Francisco
Line F (Buenos Aires Underground)
RapidRide F Line, a bus route in King County, Washington, United States